Daniel Bonjour (born September 28, 1981) is a South Africa–born actor, director and screenwriter best known for his roles in The Walking Dead, Frequency, and iZombie.

Early life
Bonjour was born in Johannesburg, South Africa. His father is South African commercial editor and director who worked under the name Trevor Hill and his mother is Swiss. He moved with his family to Switzerland at the age of 5 and returned to South Africa at 8. At the age of 12 his family relocated to Seattle, Washington. He attended Mercer Island High School and graduated from Boston College

Career
Daniel starred in his first movie when he was 12, but didn't continue his career until 2007 starring predominantly in indie films and landed his first role as series regular in the science fiction series RCVR for which he received the Best Actor Award from the International Academy of Web Television.  In 2016 Daniel was cast as Daniel Lawrence in the CW series Frequency opposite Peyton List and Mekhi Phifer

Daniel is the first ever winner of the International Academy of Web Television for Male Actor in a Drama in 2013.

Frequency was the first project where he performed in his native South African accent.

Daniel is also a writer and the grand prize winner of the Final Draft Screenwriting competition, having won the feature film category in 2015.

He has worked on several award-winning video games including the Hitman series, Final Fantasy, and Life is Strange.

Personal life
Daniel is married to actress Jelly Howie. They have one child, a son named Brixton Riot Bonjour. Daniel has one brother named Pascal who lives in Seattle, as do both his parents. 
He was forced to leave his honeymoon with Jelly Howie in Thailand to fly to Atlanta to film The Walking Dead.

People magazine included Daniel as one of Hollywood's hottest up and comers in their People Magazine 'One's to Watch' category.

Filmography

Film

Television

Video Games

References

External links 

Living people
1981 births
21st-century South African male actors
Boston College alumni
Male actors from Johannesburg
Mercer Island High School alumni
South African male film actors
South African male television actors
South African male video game actors
South African male voice actors